Matahora Airport (Indonesian: Bandar Udara Matahora)  is an airport located in Wangi-wangi Island, Wakatobi Regency, Southeast Sulawesi, Indonesia. The airport serves as the point of entry to the Wakatobi National Park, a major international tourist destination, and the surrounding environs.

Construction
Construction of the airport began in 2007 with an investment of 100 billion Rupiah from the Southeast Sulawesi provincial government. The airport was inaugurated on 22 May 2009 by the sitting Indonesian Minister of Transportation Jusman Syafii Djamal.

Expansion
A new terminal was inaugurated on 8 May 2016 by former Minister of Transportation Ignasius Jonan. New facilities include a more spacious boarding lounge, more modern check-in counter, arranged concession area and more hygienic toilets. Other land facilities include a building for the Rescue & Fire Fighting Services, a non-directional beacon, a quarantine building and a wider parking area for vehicles. A taxiway with an area of  has also been constructed. Security-related facilities have also been improved, such as additional security screening facilities (x-ray baggage), and the construction of security posts.

Matahora Airport will be upgraded to an international airport to support the development of local tourism in 2019. The upgrade of this airport status because Wakatobi was selected to be one of ten tourist destinations set by the government. To support the increase of this airport into an international airport, there needs to be a revamp of the runway.

Further expansions to the runway, apron, and the cargo loading area is planned for 2021.

Airlines and destinations

Wings Air, Citilink, and Garuda Indonesia (until January 4, 2022) operate routes to and from Matahora Airport using ATR-72s.

References

Airports in Southeast Sulawesi